Pastoreo Fútbol Club,  also known as Pastoreo FC or simply Pastoreo, is a Paraguayan football club based in Doctor Juan Manuel Frutos, locally known as Pastoreo. The club was founded in 2020 and plays in the División Intermedia. It belongs to the Caaguazú Football Federation and was the 2019–20 Campeonato Nacional de Interligas champion.

History
The club was founded on 14 June 2020, based on the team representing the Pastoreo Sports League (Liga Deportiva de Pastoreo) in the Campeonato Nacional de Interligas, which won the competition in its 2019–20 edition after beating the team representing the Hernandarias league in the final. With this title the Pastoreo league earned the right to compete in the División Intermedia, however, in order to take part in competitions overseen by the Paraguayan Football Association such as the División Intermedia, teams promoted from the Campeonato Nacional de Interligas have to be refounded as clubs, causing the Liga de Pastoreo team to be refounded as Pastoreo Fútbol Club.

Although they were entitled to enter the 2021 Paraguayan División Intermedia competition by having won the 2019–20 Interligas championship, the cancellation of the 2020 División Intermedia season due to the COVID-19 pandemic meant that they had their debut postponed to 2022 per decision by the APF's Executive Committee, since Guaraní de Trinidad (who were originally slated to have their debut in 2020) already held the berth reserved to the Unión del Fútbol del Interior (UFI) for that season as 2019 Primera B Nacional champions.

References

External links
 Soccerway Profile

Football clubs in Paraguay